Acacia armitii is a shrub belonging to the genus Acacia and the subgenus Juliflorae that is native to north eastern Australia. It is considered as near threatened in Queensland.

Description
The bark on the trunk and main branches is grey and fissured. Like most species of Acacia it has phyllodes rather than true leaves. The yellowish-green coloured phyllodes are resinous and erect and are flat and straight or slightly curved with a very narrowly elliptic to almost linear shape. It blooms between June and July and also September and October.

Etymology
The specific epithet, armitii, honours William Edington (de Marguerittes) Armit (1848–1901).

Distribution
It is native to areas around the Einasleigh River in central-northern Queensland and is found on a sandstone plateau to the south of the Goomadeer River and also along Coopers Creek near Nabarlek in the Northern Territory and is known to grow in rocky, sandy or shallow soils along creek banks and river flats and floodplains.

See also
List of Acacia species

References

armitii
Flora of Queensland
Flora of the Northern Territory
Taxa named by Ferdinand von Mueller